Dennis L. Fowler is the Vice President and Medical Director for Perioperative Services at NewYork-Presbyterian Hospital/Columbia University Medical Center. He is a pioneer in the field of endoscopic surgery and has been the first to perform numerous innovative laparoscopic surgical procedures, never before accomplished (NYP). Fowler was also the first general surgeon to use the Harmonic Scalpel (NY Magazine), a device that uses wave frequency (instead of electric current) to divide the tissue and vibration to coagulate blood vessels (Outpatient Surgery Magazine).

Innovative surgical procedures, not previously accomplished laparoscopically
Laparoscopic Sigmoid Resection, 1990
Laparoscopic Gastroenterostomy, 1991
Laparoscopic Truncal Vagotomy, Antrectomy, and Billroth II, 1991
Laparoscopic Resection of Benign Submucosal Gastric Tumor, 1991
Laparoscopic Transduodenal Sphincteroplasty of the Minor Papilla, 1998

Selected publications
 Comparison of Two Composite Meshes using Two Fixation Devices in a Porcine Laparoscopic Ventral Hernia Repair Model. Duffy AJ, Hogle NJ, LaPerle KM, Fowler DL. Hernia, 2004. 
 More than a numbers game: credentialing for minimally invasive procedures. Fowler DL, Bailey R, Ikramuddin S, Wexner S. Published as a symposium, Fowler DL as moderator. Cont Surg, 60: 103–112, 2004. 
 In-Vivo Stereoscopic Imaging System with 5 Degrees-of-Freedom for Minimal Access Surgery. Miller A, Allen P, Fowler DL. MMVR 12 (Proceedings), 234–240. IOS Press, 2004.

External links
Dennis L. Fowler at SE Healthcare
Dr. Dennis L. Fowler at Columbia University Department of Surgery
Columbia University Medical Center

References
https://web.archive.org/web/20070607180313/http://www.nyp.org/masc/about.htm
http://nymag.com/bestdoctors/articles/02/kindestcut/3.htm
http://www.outpatientsurgery.net/2002/os09/f5.shtml

American surgeons
Medical educators
Columbia University faculty
Columbia Medical School faculty
Living people
Year of birth missing (living people)